The 1979 Canadian Open was the sixth edition of the snooker tournament the Canadian Open, which took place in September 1979.

Cliff Thorburn won the title for the fourth time, beating Terry Griffiths 17–16 in the final.


Summary
The event was held at the Canadian National Exhibition Stadium and was open to any player who paid the $30 entry fee. The top eight seeds were placed into the seventh round.

Thorburn received $6,000 as winner, with Griffiths taking $2,000 as runner-up.

Main draw
Results from the later rounds are shown below.

Other events
There were two additional events run alongside the main snooker tournament.

Women's snooker: Natalie Stelmach won the tournament by defeating Ann Johnson 4–3 in the final.
English billiards: There were 16 entrants. Joe Johnson defeated Ian Williamson 500–284 in the final.

References

1979 in snooker
Open
Open
Snooker in Canada